Vinto Municipality is the fourth municipal section of the Quillacollo Province in the Cochabamba Department, Bolivia. Its seat is Vinto.

Geography 
Some of the highest mountains of the municipality are listed below:

Cantons 
The municipality is divided into four cantons. They are (their seats in parentheses):
 Anocaraire Canton - (Anocaraire)
 La Chulla Canton - (La Chulla)
 Machac Marca Canton - (Machac Marca)
 Vinto Canton - (Vinto)

References 

  Instituto Nacional de Estadistica de Bolivia  (INE)

Municipalities of the Cochabamba Department